RX1E may refer to:

 Liaoning Ruixiang RX1E two-seat electric aircraft
 RX1e, FIA electric rallycross racing category